HMCS Bittersweet was a  that was commissioned in the Royal Navy but served primarily in the Royal Canadian Navy during the Second World War. She was used mainly in the Battle of the Atlantic as an ocean escort. She was named for flowering vines Solanum dulcamara and Celastrus scandens.

Background

Flower-class corvettes like Bittersweet serving with the Royal Canadian Navy during the Second World War were different from earlier and more traditional sail-driven corvettes.  The "corvette" designation was created by the French for a class of small warships; the Royal Navy borrowed the term for a period but discontinued its use in 1877. During the hurried preparations for war in the late 1930s, Winston Churchill reactivated the corvette class, needing a name for smaller ships used in an escort capacity, in this case based on a whaling ship design. The generic name "flower" was used to designate the class of these ships, which – in the Royal Navy – were named after flowering plants.

Construction
Bittersweet was ordered on 22 January 1940 for the Royal Navy in the 1939-1940 Flower-class building program from Marine Industries Ltd. in Sorel, Quebec. She was laid down on 17 April 1940 and launched on 12 September 1940. She was commissioned on 23 January 1941 into the Royal Navy. On 15 May 1941 she was one of ten Flower-class corvettes transferred to the Royal Canadian Navy. She could be told apart from other Canadian Flowers by her lack of minesweeping gear and the siting of the after gun tub amidships. Bittersweet had three refits in her career. Her first one was at Charleston in December 1941 which lasted until February 1942. Her second refit was at Baltimore in October to November 1943 where she had her fo'c'sle extended. The last refit took place at Pictou, Nova Scotia and lasted until February 1945.

War service
Bittersweet, after commissioning, headed back to the United Kingdom, fitting out on the Tyne and working up at Tobermory. On 15 May 1941 she was loaned to Canada and was assigned to the Newfoundland Escort Force (NEF) in June. She served as an ocean escort until December of that year. In March 1942 after resuming her duties she joined several escort groups as part of Mid-Ocean Escort Force and served with them until October 1943 before departing for another refit. Her last ocean convoy escort duty took place in October 1944.

After another refit, Bittersweet resumed duties her duties briefly with Halifax Force before transferring to Sydney Force. She remained with Sydney Force for the remainder of the war.

Trans-Atlantic convoys escorted

Post-war service
Bittersweet was returned to the Royal Navy on 22 June 1945 at Aberdeen, Scotland. She was broken up at Rosyth in 1950.

References

Flower-class corvettes of the Royal Canadian Navy
Flower-class corvettes of the Royal Navy
1940 ships